Brian Stuart Goodell (born April 2, 1959) is an American politician, former competitive swimmer, two-time Olympic champion, and former world record-holder in two events. He is a city councilman and former mayor of Mission Viejo, California.

Career
At the 1976 Olympic Games in Montreal, Quebec, he won gold medals for his first-place finishes in the 400-meter and 1,500-meter freestyle events. He also won gold medals in both events at the 1979 Pan American Games in San Juan, Puerto Rico. He received a silver medal in 1,500-meter freestyle at the 1975 World Aquatics Championships in Cali, Colombia.

After graduating from Mission Viejo High School, he attended college at the University of California, Los Angeles (UCLA), where he swam for coach Ron Ballatore's UCLA Bruins swimming and diving team in National Collegiate Athletic Association (NCAA) and Pacific-10 Conference competition from 1978 to 1980.  During his college swimming career, he won nine NCAA individual championships, including three times in each of the 500-yard freestyle, 1,650-yard freestyle, and the 400-yard individual medley.

Goodell held the 400-meter freestyle (long course) world record from June 18, 1976 to April 6, 1979, and the 1,500-meter freestyle (long course) world record from 1976 to 1980.

He was recognized as the Male World Swimmer of the Year by Swimming World magazine in 1977.  He was inducted into the International Swimming Hall of Fame as an "Honor Swimmer" in 1986.

Brian and his wife, Vicki Goodell, are currently licensed Realtors in California and have created The Gold Medal Group with Berkshire Hathaway.

In 2016, Goodell was elected to the City Council of his hometown of Mission Viejo, California, and is serving as its mayor for calendar year 2020.

See also

 List of Olympic medalists in swimming (men)
 List of University of California, Los Angeles people
 List of World Aquatics Championships medalists in swimming (men)
 World record progression 400 metres freestyle
 World record progression 1500 metres freestyle

References

External links
 
 Council Member Brian Goodell - Official City Council Biography from the City of Mission Viejo
 Brian Goodell for City Council - Official campaign web site
 
 
 Portrait of Brian Goodell coming up for air, 1978. Los Angeles Times Photographic Archive (Collection 1429). UCLA Library Special Collections, Charles E. Young Research Library, University of California, Los Angeles.

1959 births
Living people
American athlete-politicians
American male freestyle swimmers
World record setters in swimming
Olympic gold medalists for the United States in swimming
Pan American Games gold medalists for the United States
Sportspeople from Mission Viejo, California
Sportspeople from Stockton, California
Swimmers at the 1976 Summer Olympics
Swimmers at the 1979 Pan American Games
UCLA Bruins men's swimmers
World Aquatics Championships medalists in swimming
Medalists at the 1976 Summer Olympics
California Republicans
California city council members
Mayors of places in California
Pan American Games medalists in swimming
Medalists at the 1979 Pan American Games
Mission Viejo High School alumni